Al-Batani al-Sharqi was a Palestinian Arab village in the Gaza Subdistrict, located  northeast  of Gaza situated in the flat terrain on the southern coastal plain of Palestine. It had a population of 650 in 1945. Al-Batani al-Sharqi was depopulated during the 1948 Arab-Israeli War.

History
Ceramics from the  Byzantine era have been found here, together with coins from  reigns of  Phocas and  Constantine IV.

One  mention of al-Batani indicates that it was founded as a ranch by the Umayyad caliph Mu'awiyah I in the 8th century CE.

Ottoman era
Al-Batani al-Sharqi, like the rest of Palestine, was incorporated into the Ottoman Empire in 1517, and in the tax registers of 1596,  it was a village in the nahiya of Gaza, east of Isdud, north of Bayt Daras and part of the Sanjak of Gaza with a population of 39. Al-Batani paid taxes on wheat, barley, fruit, beehives, goats, and vineyards. The whole population was Muslim. The village appeared as an unnamed village on the map of Pierre Jacotin compiled in 1799.

In 1838,  Robinson noted el-Butaniyeh, the east, as Muslim village  located in the Gaza district.

In 1863 the French explorer Victor Guérin visited the village  which he called Bathanieh Ech-Charkieh. He found about 100 adobe brick houses, and ancient stones lying on the ground near a well. Tobacco plantations grew in  gardens surrounded by cactus hedges.  

Socin, citing an official Ottoman village list compiled around 1870, noted that  Al-Batani al-Sharqi  had   89 houses and a population of  265, though the population count included  men, only. Hartmann found that  el-batanije esch-scharkije  had 85  houses. 

In 1882, the PEF's  Survey of Western Palestine (SWP) described al-Batani al-Sharqi as being situated on low ground and extended from east to west in a rectangular shape. Patches of garden and a number of wells surrounded the village.

British Mandate era
In the 1922 census of Palestine, conducted by the  British Mandate authorities,  Batani Sharqi had a population of 304 inhabitants, all Muslims, increasing in the 1931 census  to 404, still all Muslim, in  85 houses.

Village houses, made of adobe, with wood-and-cane roofs, were built close together along narrow alleys. The two al-Batanis shared an elementary school that was opened in 1947; its initial enrollment was 119 students. The village had a mosque and a number of small shops. The entire population was Muslim.

In the 1945 statistics  Al-Batani al-Sharqi had a population of 650, all Muslims,  with 5,764  dunams of land, according to an official land and population survey.  Of this, 319  dunams were allocated to citrus and banana plants, 474 plantations and irrigable land, 4,733 used for cereals, while 32  dunams were built-up land.

1948 war and aftermath
In early May, 1948,  the  Al-Majdal Arab National Committee, (NC), ordered the villagers of Al-Batani al-Sharqi, together with those of Al-Batani al-Gharbi, Yasur,  Bayt Daras and the three Sawafir villages to stay put.

It  became depopulated shortly afterwards as part of Palmach's   'Operation Lightning' (Mivtza Barak).  After they had hit  Bayt Daras, the operational orders to Haganah  on the 10 May was to "subdue" Al-Batani al-Gharbi and Al-Batani al-Sharqi, "with the same means used vis-à-vis Aqir, Bashshit and Bayt Daras."

Together with nearby Bashshit and Barqa, al-Batani al-Sharqi was captured by the Haganah's Givati Brigade, just before the end of the British Mandate period in Palestine. According to Israeli historian Benny Morris, it fell on May 13, 1948, as part of Operation Barak in which the Haganah moved southwards in anticipation of an engagement with Egyptian forces.

The History of the War of Independence, however, states that it was captured by Israeli Jewish forces under the Givati Brigade's Eighth Battalion on June 10–11. Palestinian historian Walid Khalidi said that this may have meant that the village briefly changed hands in the course of Israeli-Egyptian battles on the southern front before the first truce came into effect on June 11.

In early 1949 American Quaker relief workers reported that many those living in tents in what became Maghazi refugee camp had come from Al-Batani al-Sharqi.

Following the war the area was incorporated into the State of Israel, with the villages lands remaining undeveloped. In 1992 the village site was described: "Only a dilapidated police station from the Mandate period survives. It is a complex of three single-storey, concrete flat-roofed buildings. One of the buildings is higher than the other two; all three have rectangular doors and windows. A village street is clearly visible. Cactuses and fig, eucalyptus, and sycamore trees are scattered over the site. Israeli farmers cultivate citrus on the adjacent lands."

See also
Depopulated Palestinian locations in Israel

References

Bibliography

External links
Welcome To al-Batani al-Sharqi
 al-Batani al-Sharqi,  Zochrot
Survey of Western Palestine, Map 16:   IAA, Wikimedia commons
al-Batani al-Sharqi the Khalil Sakakini Cultural Center

District of Gaza
Arab villages depopulated prior to the 1948 Arab–Israeli War
Populated places established in the 8th century